The Roman Catholic Diocese of Kavieng is  a suffragan diocese of the Roman Catholic Archdiocese of Rabaul. It was erected Vicariate Apostolic in 1957 and elevated to a diocese in 1966.

Bishops
Alfred Matthew Stemper, M.S.C. (1957–1980) 
Karl Hesse, M.S.C. (24 October 1980 – 7 July 1990), appointed Archbishop of Rabaul
Ambrose Kiapseni, M.S.C. (21 January 1991 – 22 June 2018)
Rochus Josef Tatamai, M.S.C. (22 June 2018 – 19 June 2020), appointed Archbishop of Rabaul

External links and references

Kavieng